Formica subsericea, colloquially known as the black field ant, is a species of ant in the genus Formica. It is found in the eastern United States and Canada. Workers of this species are incredibly fast and quite timid. Workers of this species are commonly found working as slaves in Polyergus colonies. Nuptial flights typically occur in July or August. It is often confused with another Formica species, Formica fusca.

References

External links

subsericea
Hymenoptera of North America
Insects described in 1836